Heart UK (formerly Heart Extra) is a digital radio station owned and operated by Global as a national version of Heart, and broadcast from studios at Leicester Square in London.

On 2 February 2016, Global announced that the station would launch as Heart Extra on national DAB on 29 February. As Heart Extra, the station broadcast a presenter-free music sequence from 10am-4pm on weekdays, and simulcast Heart London programming outside this time.

On 14 March 2017, Heart Extra was removed from the Sky and Virgin Media TV platforms in favour of new sibling Heart 80s. Heart Extra continued to broadcast on DAB and online as before. Global closed Heart Extra on 12 March 2020 and replaced it with a full-time 'Heart UK' national feed.

Heart Extra Xmas
Heart Extra was re-branded as Heart Extra Xmas, a pop-up Christmas music service with the slogan 'Turn up the festive feel good!', during November and December 2016. The pop-up festive offering was Global's successor to the prior Smooth Christmas service. Heart Extra Xmas ran again at the end of 2017. Heart Extra Xmas was relaunched again for 2018, this time running between 3 November until midnight on 26 December 2018. Heart Extra Xmas relaunched for 2019 on 1 November 2019. It relaunched on 25 October 2020 branded as Heart Xmas following the closure of Heart Extra in March 2020. Heart Xmas relaunched for 2021 on 15 October ran until 27 December.

Heart Xmas returned in 2022 for a 7th consecutive year, launching on 23rd September.

References

External links

UK
Global Radio
Radio stations established in 2016